Alice Eliza Loane writing as M. Loane (23 October 1863 – 18 January 1922) was a British author. She is known for being a party to a deception where the joint works of her and her sister were published as the sole work of her sister Martha Loane. In 1910 they fell out and Alice created the only book in her name.

Life
Loane was born in Southsea in 1863. Her elder sister Martha became a nurse and by 1897 the first article was appearing in the Nursing Notes. Over the next 14 years, more articles appeared in Nursing Notes and then she moved on to the Evening News and The Spectator. Using their joint expertise she wrote nursing textbooks including The District Nurse as Health Missioner. Alice's most valued works work social commentaries which described the poverty at that time. The first of these, The Queen's Poor, was published in 1905.

They were close until 1910 when her sister Martha's conversion to Catholicism caused a break. When Alice died in 1922 it was found that she had written a will to leave her estate to her sister but the will was not signed. Because of the lack of signature her will was not cleared until four years after her sister's death.

Loane died in Clifton in 1922.

Works
These were all published under M.Loane or a similar name but these were attributed to Alice with input from her sister long after they had both died.

 Nursing Notes between 1897 and 1907
 Evening News between 1907 and 1910
 The Spectator between 1910 and 1911 
 The District Nurse as Health Missioner
 The Duties of a Superintendent in a Small Home for District Nurses
 The Incidental Opportunities of District Nursing
 Outlines of Routine in District Nursing, 1904
 Simple Sanitation, 1905
 Simple Introductory Lessons in Midwifery, 1906
 The Queen's Poor, 1905
 The Next Street but One, 1907
 From their Point of View, 1908
 Neighbours and Friends, 1909
 An Englishman's Castle, 1910
 The Common Growth, 1911
 Shipmates (1912) the only writing under her own name

References

1863 births
1922 deaths
People from Southsea
British women writers